This is a list of Universal Motown Republic Group musical artists.

Universal Motown records

A-F
Akon
Ashley Ring
Avery 
Birdman
Brisco
Bow Wow
Erykah Badu
Drake Bell
Blue October
Ron Browz
Vita Chambers
Cap 1
Corneille
Cory Gunz
Crash Kings
Kid Cudi
Kat Deluna
Days Difference
Down With Webster
Drake 
 DJ Khaled
Four Year Strong
Forever the Sickest Kids
Flobots

G-K
Get Scared
Gudda Gudda
Hyper Crush
Jada
JoJo
Kaiser Chiefs 
Kelly Rowland
Kem

L-P
Reni Lane
Little Fish
Lil Chuckee
Lil' Kim
Lil Twist
London
Mack Maine
Maloco Júnior
Melanie Fiona
Glasses Malone 
Jadyn Maria
Jae Millz
Katie Melua
Nicki Minaj
J.R. Get Money
Colin Munroe
Nelly
Pac Div
Paper Route
Tina Parol
Pixie Lott
After Midnight Project

Q-U
Q-Tip
Busta Rhymes
Jimmy Robbins
Asher Roth
SafetySuit
Shanell
Short Dawg
Raven-Symoné
T Lopez
T-Streets
Tina Parol
Tyga

V-Z
The Veer Union
Waii
Lil Wayne
Tionne "T-Boz" Watkins
Stevie Wonder

Universal Republic records

A-F
Anberlin
Alter Bridge
India.Arie
Cash Cash
Chamillionaire
Colbie Caillat
Owl City
3 Doors Down
Kate Earl
Flobots
Michael Franti

G-K
Godsmack
Jay Sean
Erik Hassle 
Hinder
Blak Jak
The Lonely Island
Lil Jon
Kevin Rudolf

L-P
Leighton Meester
Steel Panther

Q-U
C-Side
Spose

V-Z
We Are the Fallen
Karl Wolf
 YC
10 Years

Casablanca records
Mika
Ryan Leslie
Mike Tower

SRC records
Akon
David Banner
Tami Chynn
Asher Roth
Shontelle
Tionne "T-Boz" Watkins
Marky
Aubrey O'Day

Universal Motown Republic
Motown artists